Prionapteryx is a genus of moths of the family Crambidae.

Species
Prionapteryx achatina Zeller, 1863
Prionapteryx acreonalis (Walker, 1863)
Prionapteryx africalis Hampson, 1896
Prionapteryx albescens (Hampson, 1919)
Prionapteryx albiceps (Hampson, 1919)
Prionapteryx albicostalis (Hampson, 1919)
Prionapteryx albimaculalis (Hampson, 1919)
Prionapteryx albipennis Butler, 1886
Prionapteryx albofascialis (Hampson, 1919)
Prionapteryx amathusia Bassi & Mey in Mey, 2011
Prionapteryx annusalis (Walker, 1863)
Prionapteryx arenalis (Hampson, 1919)
Prionapteryx argentescens (Hampson, 1919)
Prionapteryx banaadirensis Bassi, 2013
Prionapteryx bergii (Zeller, 1877)
Prionapteryx brevivittalis Hampson, 1919
Prionapteryx cuneolalis (Hulst, 1886)
Prionapteryx delicatellus Caradja, 1927
Prionapteryx diaperatalis (Hampson, 1919)
Prionapteryx diaplecta (Meyrick, 1936)
Prionapteryx eberti Bassi & Mey in Bassi, 2013
Prionapteryx elongata (Zeller, 1877)
Prionapteryx endoleuca (Hampson, 1919)
Prionapteryx eugraphis (Walker, 1863)
Prionapteryx flavipars (Hampson, 1919)
Prionapteryx hedyscopa (Lower, 1905)
Prionapteryx helena Bassi, 2013
Prionapteryx indentella (Kearfott, 1908)
Prionapteryx lancerotella (Rebel, 1892)
Prionapteryx mesozonalis Hampson, 1919
Prionapteryx moghrebana (D. Lucas, 1954)
Prionapteryx molybdella (Hampson, 1919)
Prionapteryx nebulifera Stephens, 1834
Prionapteryx neotropicalis (Hampson, 1896)
Prionapteryx nephalia (Meyrick, 1936)
Prionapteryx ochrifasciata (Hampson, 1919)
Prionapteryx phaeomesa (Hampson, 1919)
Prionapteryx plumbealis (Hampson, 1919)
Prionapteryx rubricalis Hampson, 1919
Prionapteryx rubrifusalis (Hampson, 1919)
Prionapteryx santella (Kearfott, 1908)
Prionapteryx scitulellus (Walker, 1866)
Prionapteryx selenalis (Hampson, 1919)
Prionapteryx serpentella Kearfott, 1908
Prionapteryx somala Bassi, 2013
Prionapteryx spasmatica Meyrick, 1936
Prionapteryx splendida Bassi & Mey in Mey, 2011
Prionapteryx termia (Meyrick, 1885)
Prionapteryx texturella (Zeller, 1877)
Prionapteryx triplecta (Meyrick, 1935)
Prionapteryx yavapai (Kearfott, 1908)

Former species
Prionapteryx albipunctella (Marion, 1957)
Prionapteryx albostigmata (Rothschild, 1921)
Prionapteryx alikangiella (Strand, 1918)
Prionapteryx alternalis Maes, 2002
Prionapteryx amselella (Bleszynski, 1965)
Prionapteryx carmensita Bleszynski, 1970
Prionapteryx diffusilinea (Hampson, 1919)
Prionapteryx invectalis (Walker, 1863)
Prionapteryx margherita (Bleszynski, 1965)
Prionapteryx nigrifascialis (Walker, 1866)
Prionapteryx obeliscota (Meyrick, 1936)
Prionapteryx rufistrigalis (Fawcett, 1918)
Prionapteryx soudanensis (Hampson, 1919)
Prionapteryx strioliger (Rothschild, 1913)
Prionapteryx thysbesalis Walker, 1863

References

Natural History Museum Lepidoptera genus database

Ancylolomiini
Crambidae genera
Taxa named by James Francis Stephens